'"Southasia"' could mean one of the following:

SOUTHASIA Magazine, an English-language political magazine about South asia, published in Pakistan
Himal Southasian, a news magazine published in Sri Lanka
Southasia Trust, a company based in Latipur, Nepal, which publishes and distributes the Himal Southasia magazine.